"1234" is a song from Feist's third studio album, The Reminder. The song was co-written by Feist and Sally Seltmann, an Australian singer-songwriter who also recorded under the stage name New Buffalo. It remains Feist's biggest hit single in the US to date, and her only song to chart on the Billboard Hot 100 and UK Top 40.

History
In an interview with Songfacts, Sally Seltmann said:

On December 14, 2005, Feist played the song live at The Trabendo in Paris, France in a show broadcast on Europe2 TV, with the title "Sally's Song" and with somewhat different lyrics than in the commercially released version.

The original version of the song was mixed by Renaud Letang. It was later remixed by Van She Tech, an offshoot of the band Van She.

Release
The song was digitally released through iTunes Store. It gained notice after its use in an iPod nano commercial.  It also appeared in an Australian commercial for eBay. It has been released in the United Kingdom, in Canada and in other countries digitally.

Chart performance
Since its digital release, "1234" peaked at number four on the US Hot Digital Songs chart. The single also reached number eight on the US Hot 100, number 10 on the US Pop 100, and number 34 on the US Modern Rock Tracks chart. As of July 25, 2011, "1234" had sold 1.2 million downloads in the US. The single's unexpected success led to its release worldwide. In the UK it proved to be a huge hit, making the top 10 and peaking at number eight. It had a very successful release in Canada, making it to number two. The song also entered the top 10 in several European countries. The single's success made Feist famous globally and boosted sales of her other releases. It also managed to debut at number 67 on the Australian ARIA Singles Chart, as digital tracks were counted towards chart positions from November 5, 2007, onwards in Australia. It later entered the top 50 of the chart in late December and peaked at number 36. It also ranked number 34 in the Triple J Hottest 100.

In the April 28, 2008, episode of The Colbert Report where she was a guest, Feist said that she had planned to offer "1234" as the official campaign theme for Stephen Colbert's Presidential bid, before he dropped out.

As of 2017 the single has been certified silver by BPI for 200,000 sold copies.

Awards and accolades
"1234" was nominated for Grammy Awards in the categories of Best Female Pop Vocal Performance and Best Short Form Music Video. Likewise, the success of the song largely contributed to Feist's other nominations that year for Best New Artist and Best Pop Vocal Album. It also won the Juno award for Single of the Year on April 6, 2008, in Calgary. Sally Seltmann also received a nomination at the 2008 APRA Awards for Song of the Year.

This song was number 19 on Rolling Stones list of the 100 Best Songs of 2007, and number nine on the list of Readers' 25 Best Songs of 2007. It was also ranked number five on Amazon.com's Best Songs of 2007. Pitchfork Media deemed the video the fifth best video of the decade, and named the song number 16 on the top 100 tracks of 2007. Blender named the video number two on The Top 10 Music Videos of 2007. In France, the video won Music Video of the Year at the Victoires de la Musique.

Time magazine named "1234" one of The 10 Best Songs of 2007, ranking it at number two after "Rehab" by Amy Winehouse. Writer Josh Tyrangiel called the song a “masterpiece”, praising Feist for singing it “with a mixture of wisdom and exuberance that's all her own."

Charts

Weekly charts

Year-end charts

Certifications

Cover versions
The song was rewritten as a counting song for a performance on Sesame Street, in which Feist counts chickens, monsters (Elmo, Zoe, Rosita, and Telly) and penguins to 4.

Brooke White of American Idol fame performed a cover of "1234" during her set on the American Idols LIVE! Tour 2008, which ran from July 1 to September 13.

Electropop band Joy Electric released a cover of the song in 2009 on their album Favorites at Play.

Parodies
It was parodied by MADtv for the continuous releases of new iPods, a commercial in which the song was originally used.

In popular culture
It was sung by the character of Andy Bernard in "Lecture Circuit", an episode of The Office, in an attempt to woo a client he finds attractive. This attempt fails, and Dunder Mifflin loses the account. It was used in a trailer for the 2009 film New York, I Love You. It was also used in the ending of The Inbetweeners Series 1 episode, 'Bunk Off'.

Singer-songwriter Kenny Loggins covered the song for his 2009 album All Join In. The lyrics were changed because of dark subject material and the song also featured Kenny's 11-year-old daughter Hana.

Pianist Louis Durra recorded an instrumental trio version released on Mad World EP and Arrogant Doormats (2011).

The song plays over the opening sequence of "Green Juice," the third episode of the limited American drama series The Dropout about disgraced Theranos founder Elizabeth Holmes (2022).

References

External links
 
 

2007 singles
Feist (singer) songs
Cherrytree Records singles
2007 songs
Songs written by Sally Seltmann
Songs written by Feist (singer)
Juno Award for Single of the Year singles